Dr. Jung Kong Lee (December 1924 – 31 January 1990) was a Hong Kong-born American-educated chemist and politician. He was member of the Hysan Lee family and a chemist at the University of Kansas. He was also a member of the Hong Kong Basic Law Consultative Committee.

Biography
Lee was born in 1924 into the prominent Lee family. His father, Hysan Lee, was a multi millionaire who was nicknamed the "King of Opium". He served in the National Revolutionary Army during the Second World War, in which he was an interpreter for General Joe Stillwell's army in the China Burma India Theater. He attended Lingnan College before he moved to the United States, where he attended Princeton University, majoring in chemistry and attaining membership in Sigma Xi. He was also a member of the Campus Club. In 1955, he received a doctoral degree in chemistry and took up a post-doctoral study at the Massachusetts Institute of Technology, before he joined the chemistry department at the University of Kansas.

He returned to Hong Kong in 1980 to take up the directorship of his family business Lee Hysan Estate Co. and then the Hysan Development Co. In 1985, he was appointed member of the Hong Kong Basic Law Consultative Committee for drafting the Basic Law of Hong Kong, the mini-constitution for the post-1997 Hong Kong, in which he was part of the Group of 89 a conservative faction consisting of businessmen and professionals. In 1989, he became the founding chairman of the New Hong Kong Alliance which emerged from the Group of 89.

Personal 
Lee's wife is Ingrid. Lee had a son Oliver.

On 31 January 1990, Lee died in Kansas City, Missouri, United States after a lengthy illness. He was 65. He was survived by his wife, son, his mother, Mrs. Hysan Lee; three brothers and five sisters.

References

1924 births
1990 deaths
Chinese military personnel of World War II
Alumni of Lingnan University (Hong Kong)
Princeton University alumni
Massachusetts Institute of Technology alumni
University of Kansas faculty
Hong Kong scientists
20th-century American chemists
Hong Kong emigrants to the United States
Progressive Hong Kong Society politicians
New Hong Kong Alliance politicians
Hong Kong expatriates in the United States